F44 or F-44 may refer to:
 F44 (classification), a para-athletics classification 
 F-44 (Michigan county highway)
 Athens Municipal Airport in Athens, Texas
 BMW 2 Series (F44), a compact car
 , a Niterói-class frigate of the Brazilian Navy
 , a T-class destroyer of the Royal Navy
 , a Talwar-class frigate of the Indian Navy
 JP-5 jet fuel